Hazelle is a feminine given name. Notable people with the name include:

Hazelle Goodman (born 1959), Trinidad and Tobago actress
Hazelle P. Rogers (born 1952), American politician

See also
Hazel (given name)

Feminine given names